Kjell Magnus Robin Bryntesson (born 17 October 1985 in Rossön, Ångermanland) is a Swedish cross-country skier who has been competing since 2003. His only World Cup victory took place at Whistler Olympic Park in the team sprint event on 17 January 2009.

Bryntesson also won seven FIS Races during his career since 2007.

Bryntesson won a silver medal as the sighted guide for Zebastian Modin at the 2018 Winter Paralympics in Pyeongchang.

Cross-country skiing results
All results are sourced from the International Ski Federation (FIS).

World Cup

Season standings

Team podiums
 1 victory – (1 )
 2 podiums – (2 )

References

External links

Official website

1985 births
Living people
People from Strömsund Municipality
Cross-country skiers from Västernorrland County
Swedish male cross-country skiers
Paralympic sighted guides
Medalists at the 2018 Winter Paralympics
Paralympic silver medalists for Sweden
2018 Winter Paralympians of Sweden
Paralympic medalists in cross-country skiing
Cross-country skiers at the 2018 Winter Paralympics
Paralympic cross-country skiers of Sweden